Coiled-coil domain-containing 78 (CCDC78) is a protein in humans encoded by the CCDC78 gene. It has several aliases including C16orf25, FLJ34512, CNM4, and JFP10.  It is located on the (-) strand on chromosome 16 (16p13.3). Its gene neighborhood includes NARFL (also on the minus strand), HAGHL, FAM173A, and METRN. The CCDC78 gene is 10,892 base pairs long, and the protein contains 438 amino acids.  The protein weighs approximately 4.852 KDal.  There are several isoforms, including one indicated with a unique congenital myopathy.  Several expression profiles show it has ubiquitous expression at moderate levels. Although no paralogs exist several orthologs do.



Function 
The function of this gene is currently unknown. There is evidence that CCDC78 plays a role in skeletal muscle contraction. This is supported by structural similarities to other muscle proteins and by localization assays. CCDC78's predicted structure was similar to that of tropomyosin (see below).  The gene product is found primarily in the perinuclear region, the sarcolemmal membrane, and in the reticular pattern of the sarcoplasm. However, localization assays predict it to also be found in the cytoplasm.

mRNA 

General Properties:  
 Genomic DNA length: 10,892 bp
 Most common translated mRNA length: 1,317 bp 
 5' Untranslated region: 447 bp
 3' Untranslated region: 2188 bp
Transcript Variants:  
There are 13 known alternative splicing patterns. These can be seen in the adjacent image. One of these is indicated in disease.

Protein 
General Properties: 
 Contains two coiled-coil domains
 Molecular Weight: 4.852 KDal
 Isoelectric Point: 8.27

Expression 
When looking at EST profiles in humans, CCDC78 seems to show ubiquitous expression at moderate levels.

Predicted post-translational modification:
Phosphorylation of several serine residues has been predicted by using tools at ExPasy.

Predicted secondary structure 
Secondary structure of CCDC78 was predicted using the protein secondary structure prediction tool PELE. As would be expected with a coiled-coil domain containing protein, there are several α-helices.  The model was predicted to be 98% accurate to 65% of the protein. The predicted image can be seen below. 
This predicted model is closely related to tropomyosin - a contractile protein.

Protein-protein interactions 
Only one protein has been found to interact with CCDC78. An analysis performed from IntAct showed an interaction between CCDC78 and dAK1_1 in Yersinia pestis.

Homology 
CCDC78 has no known paralogs in the human genome. However, it has several orthologs in other organisms. Orthologs can be found throughout the animal kingdom. CCDC78 is highly conserved in mammals. The coiled-coil domain is highly conserved throughout all orthologs, demonstrating the importance of these domains.

Clinical relevance 
A mutation in this gene has been shown to cause a unique congenital myopathy. This mutation is caused by alternative splicing - a 222 bp in-frame insertion. A group of researchers from the University of Michigan analyzed a family with a dominantly inherited congenital myopathy. After linkage analysis followed by whole-exome capture and next-generation sequencing, they found CCDC78 to be present in affected individuals and absent in >10,000 controls.  They then successfully modeled this congenital myopathy in zebrafish. CCDC78 has also been associated with an immune response to Hepatitis B.

References 

Human proteins